Crypthonia is a genus of lichen-forming fungi in the family Arthoniaceae. It has 16 species. The genus was circumscribed in 2010 by Andreas Frisch and Göran Thor, with Crypthonia polillensis assigned as the type species.

Species
Crypthonia albida 
Crypthonia athertonensis 
Crypthonia bella 
Crypthonia biseptata 
Crypthonia brevispora 
Crypthonia citrina 
Crypthonia corticorygmoides 
Crypthonia divaricatica 
Crypthonia lichexanthonica  – Brazil
Crypthonia mycelioides 
Crypthonia olivacea Frisch 
Crypthonia palaeotropica 
Crypthonia polillensis 
Crypthonia streimannii 
Crypthonia submuriformis 
Crypthonia vandenboomii

References

Arthoniaceae
Arthoniomycetes genera
Lichen genera
Taxa described in 2010